The Mizoroki−Heck coupling of aryl halides and alkenes to form C(sp2)–C(sp2) bonds has become a staple transformation in organic synthesis, owing to its broad functional group compatibility and varied scope. In stark contrast, the palladium-catalyzed reductive Heck reaction has received considerably less attention, despite the fact that early reports of this reaction date back almost half a century. From the perspective of retrosynthetic logic, this transformation is highly enabling because it can forge alkyl–aryl linkages from widely available alkenes, rather than from the less accessible and/or more expensive alkyl halide or organometallic C(sp3) synthons that are needed in a classical aryl/alkyl cross-coupling.

In part due to the historical difficulties of developing a generally applicable palladium(0)-catalyzed reductive Heck protocol that is compatible with diverse alkenes, various alternative strategies to achieve alkene hydroarylation have been developed. These include dual catalytic approaches, reactions involving other metals, and mechanistically distinct palladium-catalyzed methods.

Mechanistic Overview 
Based on various experimental observations, it has been proposed that the operative mechanism of the conventional Mizoroki−Heck reaction varies subtly depending on the reaction conditions; however, the general mechanism is as follows: the catalytic cycle begins with oxidative addition of a C(sp2)–X (X = Br, Cl, I, OTf, etc.) bond to a palladium(0) complex followed by 1,2-migratory insertion to access an alkylpalladium(II) intermediate (1). This C(sp3)–PdII intermediate then succumbs to rapid β-hydride elimination to deliver the functionalized alkene product, followed by regeneration of palladium(0) via HX reductive elimination.

The reductive Heck reaction follows a similar mechanism, but involves intercepting the alkylpalladium(II) intermediate (2) with a hydride source (most commonly formate) to form a palladium complex (3) that can readily undergo reductive cleavage to form a new C–H bond. Favoring the reductive pathway can be challenging due to competing β-hydride elimination; however, conformationally restricted olefins that lack β-hydrogens syn-periplanar relative to the C(sp3)–PdII can render β-hydride elimination inoperable. Additionally, substrates that have the ability to form stabilized π-allyl/π-benzyl/enolate intermediates can also react to give formal reductive Heck products. More recently, protocols have been developed that allow for reductive Heck coupling of unactivated aliphatic and heteroatom-substituted alkenes, which are discussed below.

Reductive Heck Reactions

Reactions with Strained Alkenes 
In a seminal study in 1980, Catellani took advantage of the diastereospecificity of migratory insertion and β-hydride elimination with norbornene substrates, allowing interception of the alkylpalladium(II) intermediate 11. In these systems, ligand exchange of the halide with formate results in formation of the norbornyl palladium species (12), which undergoes decarboxylation (12 → 13) and reductive elimination to afford the corresponding product. Later work improved the efficiency of the reaction with piperidine and tetraalkylammonium salt additives.

Asymmetric reductive Heck couplings of norbornene scaffolds were first reported in 1991 using (R,R)-NorPhos, albeit with moderate enantioselectivity. Subsequent reports found that enantioinduction could be improved through judicious choice of ligand (switching to P,N- or N,N- type ligands) and coupling partners (use of triflates over iodides). The latter observation has been posited to arise from a suppression of competing reduction of the C(sp2)–PdII intermediate prior to alkene insertion.

Following the successful development of asymmetric reductive Heck couplings on norbornene, this strategy was soon extended to oxanorbornene and azanorbornene substrates. Although the exact conditions and absolute configurations are not reported, Fiaud and coworkers reported an interesting observation regarding the reductive Heck arylation of 17. Enantioselectivity was strongly influenced by the nature of the halide/pseudohalide employed, with aryl triflates coupling partners giving moderate enantiomeric excess (ee) while aryl iodides demonstrated no enantioinduction. This supports hypotheses of both cationic and neutral pathways analogous to the classic Mizoroki–Heck reaction [7, 8]. The asymmetric coupling of azanorbornene scaffolds has also been successful. In particular, the reductive Heck coupling of azanorbornene 19 has allowed for short, enantioselective syntheses of the alkaloid epibatidine and structural analogues [35–38]. Further, a strategy to access the natural product ibogaine and analogues (5) involves an intramolecular reductive Heck reaction facilitated by a tether, a strategy that has also been extended to non-strained alkenyl systems.

Reactions with Styrenes 
Reductive Heck hydroarylation of styrenes was first reported by Torii and colleagues in 1985. The reaction gives hydroarylated products in good yields and with high regioselectivity, albeit only with conjugated olefins. Despite being one the first reports of a reductive Heck hydroarylation, Torii’s work remains the only example proceeding via an electro-reductive mechanism.

Recently, Jin, Hu, and coworkers reported a reductive Heck coupling between styrenyl substrates and aryl bromides (the conditions also allow for unactivated C(sp2)–C(sp3) coupling). As shown by 21 and 22, methyl substitution was tolerated at the branched and terminal position of the alkene; however, phenyl substitution at these positions resulted in a significant decrease in yield, (19% and 10% for the branched and terminal positions, respectively). Other styrenyl-type substrates like 23 were compatible, as were some additional aryl bromide coupling partners (24). Kinetic and deuterium labeling experiments suggested that i-PrOH serves as the hydride source through β-H elimination.

Sigman and coworkers have developed a reductive Heck protocol for 1,3-dienes. Based on previous work on similar systems, the authors posit that the transformation involves oxidative addition of an enol triflate or nonaflate with Pd(0) to form a cationic palladium complex that can undergo migratory insertion into a 1,3-diene. The migratory insertion intermediate (26) is in equilibrium with a π-allyl intermediate (25), which is subsequently trapped by the hydride source. Reductive elimination yields tri- and tetrasubstituted alkenes in moderate to good yields and selectivity.

Reactions with Tethered Alkenes 
The bulk of the work completed on the reductive Heck reaction has been focused on enabling access to highly functionalized heterocyclic cores through a potentially enantioselective, transition-metal-catalyzed process. Larock’s seminal work on the preparation of indoline through a reductive Heck cyclization process laid the groundwork for rapidly generating heterocycles. Although Larock did not employ a chiral ligand, recent advances in the field suggest that an asymmetric variant could be developed to afford enantioenriched indolines, structures that are of interest to the pharmaceutical industry [44, 45].  

The first asymmetric reductive Heck coupling of a tethered alkene was reported in 1998 by Diaz and coworkers en route to conformationally restricted retinoids. This work only featured two examples and required the addition of calcium carbonate and silver-exchanged zeolites to give ee’s of 69% and 81%. Recent work by Zhang and coworkers using chiral sulfonamide phosphine ligands has improved the reaction to feature a broad substrate scope and high enantioselectivity (88–95% ee) without the use of stoichiometric silver additives.

In 2007, Buchwald and coworkers reported the synthesis of 3-arylindanones via an asymmetric reductive Heck cyclization using chiral biaryl phosphine ligands to couple aryl triflates or nonaflates. While pseudohalide substrates gave generally good yields and moderate enantioselectivity (50–94% ee), the use of aryl halides resulted in low conversion. The authors propose that hydride transfer to palladium occurs from the a-proton of the trialkylamine base, in this case Proton Sponge (1,8-bis(dimethylamino)naphthalene).  

Later work by Zhou (54–97% ee with biaryl phosphine ligands) and Minnaard (86–90% ee with monodentate phosphoramidite ligands) extended the scope to aryl bromides and iodides, respectively; however, the aryl bromide substrates required 1 equivalent of benzoic acid additive in order to obtain high yields and enantioselectivity. 

In their work on asymmetric reductive Heck cyclization to access 3,3-disubstituted oxindoles, Zhu and coworkers reported the only reductive Heck system to date that uses diboron/water as a hydride source. Using a chiral phosphinooxazoline ligand to couple aryl triflates afforded the desired oxindole products in high yields and enantioselectivity (70–94% ee). Notably, deuterium-labeled compounds are accessible by using D2O in the reaction, allowing easy access to deuterated chiral oxindoles.

In 2015, Jia and colleagues reported an asymmetric dearomatization of indoles via an intramolecular reductive Heck reaction to yield quaternary indolines. Using a chiral biaryl phosphine ligand and sodium formate (without trialkylamine additive) to couple aryl bromide substrates with a tethered indole moiety yielded the desired indoline products in moderate yields and high enantioselectivity (89–99% ee) in the absence of ortho-substitution on the bromobenzoyl ring. The presence of an ortho-methyl group resulted in significantly diminished yield (22%) and ee (29%). Subsequent work employing TMEDA/HCO2H as the reductant extended the scope of the reaction to tethered alkenyl bromides (93–99% ee).

Recently, Tong and coworkers reported an asymmetric reductive Heck cyclization to afford quaternary tetrahydropyridines. Using a chiral phosphinooxazoline ligand with DIPEA/HCO2H as the reductant, (Z)-1-iodo-1,6-dienes were cyclized to the corresponding tetrahydropyridines in good yields and enantioselectivity (71–99% ee). Notably, only 1,1-disubstituted and 1,1,2-trisubstituted alkenes afforded good yields and enantioselectivity. In addition, oxygen linked substrates exhibited similar reactivity, albeit with significantly diminished enantioselectivity (8–63% ee). 

In 2019, Yao and colleagues reported a reductive Heck desymmetrization of cyclopentenes to access enantioenriched bicyclo[3.2.1]octanes. A chiral bisphosphine ligand with sodium formate as the reductant yielded the desired products in good yields and high enantioselectivity. Like other systems, the presence of an ortho-methyl group (relative to the halogen) resulted in significantly diminished yield; however, the reaction was tolerant of a wide variety of other functional groups at various positions.

Reactions with Tethered Alkenes in Synthesis 
The intramolecular reductive Heck cyclization of tethered alkenes has seen extensive use in total synthesis [56–63]. One such illustrative example is seen in the synthesis of ambiguine H and hapalindole U. Baran and coworkers observed preferential formation of the undesired 7-endo-trig product and debromination when employing radical conditions on substrate 4; however, the desired 6-exo-trig cyclization was successfully observed when employing reductive Heck conditions. After extensive optimization, catalyst turnover remained relatively poor with various common palladium pre-catalysts, which the authors attributed to catalyst decomposition in the highly reducing environment. Slow addition of the more robust Herrmann’s palladacycle was found to elicit full consumption of the starting material to give product 5 in 65% isolated yield on gram-scale. A recent report by Snyder and coworkers uses almost identical reductive Heck conditions to construct a quaternary center en route to the conidiogenone natural products.

In the Carreira synthesis of (±)-gelsemoxonine, a diastereoselective reductive Heck cyclization was used to form a key oxindole ring in 72% yield as a single diastereomer. Notably, the reductive Heck conditions avoid undesired side reactivity including β-hydride elimination, destruction of the adjacent azetidine ring, and cleavage of the N−O and oxabicyclic C−O bonds.

Reactions with a,β-Unsaturated Enones/Enals 
In 1983, Cacchi and coworkers disclosed a reductive Heck arylation of enones and enals in the presence of a trialkylamine base, tetrabutylammonium halide, and formic acid additive. Under these conditions, the conjugate addition product is formed preferentially to the vinylic substitution (Mizoroki–Heck) product in high yield and selectivity. Notably, reductive Heck coupling on enones/enals features some mechanistically distinct aspects, as described in studies by Cacchi and later Minnaard.  

Both the conjugate addition and vinylic substitution mechanisms proceed through a common alkylpalladium(II) intermediate 34. In the case of vinylic substitution, internal bond rotation can result in the required syn-periplanar geometry necessary for β-hydride elimination to deliver the functionalized alkene product 37. A mixture of E/Z isomers is obtained due to the formation of a palladium enolate species (38), which facilitates reinsertion without facial preference. 

In the conjugate addition case, intermediate 34 can be intercepted with formic acid to form a palladium complex (35) that can readily undergo reductive cleavage to form the new C–H bond. Control experiments run with added Heck product have ruled out the occurrence of a tandem Mizoroki–Heck reaction followed by reduction of the alkene by a palladium–hydride species; furthermore, computational studies suggest that reductive cleavage of Pd (rather than protonolysis) results in the formation of the product.

Building on Cacchi’s original conditions, Minnaard and coworkers have introduced systems that do not require the addition of formic acid or tributylamine additives. In Pd(OAc)2 or Pd(TFA)2 catalyzed reductive Heck reactions with aryl iodide coupling partners, N,N-diisopropylethylamine (DIPEA) can serve as the reductant. When using NMP as the solvent, electron-rich and electron-neutral aryl iodides gave good selectivity and moderate yields when coupling to enones with aryl/bulky substituents; however, selectivity and yield was diminished when coupling electron-deficient aryl iodides and when substrates featured non-bulky alkyl substituents on the β-carbon.

In a related system, N-heterocyclic carbene palladium complexes can be used in combination with various reductants in NMP or DMF to generate conjugate addition products. The nature of the base has been shown to govern the course of the reaction, allowing preferential formation of either the classical Mizoroki–Heck or reductive Heck products. When applied to D-mannitol-derived substrate 39, the desired product 40 was formed diastereoselectively (5:1 anti/syn). Unfortunately, attempts to render the reductive Heck reaction enantioselective with both the N-heterocyclic carbene palladium complex and palladium acetate systems were not fruitful. 

Recently, reductive Heck conjugate additions catalyzed by binaphthyl-backbone-stabilized palladium nanoparticles have been reported. The reusable palladium nanocatalyst afforded good yields for both electron-rich and electron-poor aryl iodides as well as moderate yields for selected aryl bromides. While good yields are possible with both electron-rich and electron-poor aryl iodides, competition experiments showed that the rate is significantly faster for electron-rich aryl iodides.

Reactions with Terminal and Unactivated Alkenes 
While early reports of an intermolecular reductive Heck required activated alkenes or systems that lacked β-hydrogens, the recent development of a process employing terminal alkenes and iodoarenes has altered the landscape and offered new opportunities for advancing this promising methodology.  

Chemists at Merck identified an opportunity to use a reductive Heck reaction in their retrosynthetic analysis of NK-1 receptor antagonist precursors. The authors hypothesized that steric considerations in dihydrofuran 41 would limit the ability of the alkylpalladium intermediate to undergo β-hydride elimination (similar to the strategy invoked in the earlier discussed strained alkenes). This strategy did indeed furnish the desired product with the correct regio- and stereochemistry; however, the authors note that excess lithium chloride additive was required to prevent competing dehalogenation of the aryl iodide. Notably, this is one of few examples of a diastereoselective intermolecular reductive Heck.

In 2018, Engle and coworkers disclosed an intermolecular reductive Heck reaction of diverse terminal alkenes and select internal alkenes utilizing aqueous tetramethylammonium formate as the reductant. This method tolerated an array of functional groups, including reductively labile groups, on both the (hetero)aryl iodide and alkene coupling partners, and was generally regioselective for the anti-Markovnikov product for terminal alkenes. A variety of terminal alkenes were compatible with the conditions, including simple a-olefins, heteroatom-substituted alkenes, and alkene-containing complex molecules such as quinine (49) and various terpenes. 

In addition, cyclic internal alkenes (45 and 48) were suitable substrates, affording reasonable yields of product; however acyclic internal alkenes were poor substrates for the reaction in terms of yield and regioselectivity. Unique to this method, the authors discovered that a 10:1 phosphine to palladium loading was essential to achieve high yields and suppress the formation of Heck byproducts. The authors hypothesized that the high phosphine loading leads to coordinative saturation of the palladium center to prevent β-hydride elimination from the alkylpalladium(II) intermediate, allowing it to decarboxylate formate to produce a palladium–hydride that could reductively eliminate to give the desired product.

Recently, Wu, Loh, and coworkers reported an auxiliary-directed reductive Heck reaction of unactivated alkenes and aryl triflates utilizing proton sponge as the hydride source. The authors rely on an 8-aminoquinoline directing group to control the regioselectivity of migratory insertion and stabilize the resulting alkylpalladium(II) intermediate (50). Both terminal β,γ- and γ,δ-alkenyl carbonyl compounds were suitable substrates for the reaction; however, internal alkenes proved to be more challenging to functionalize, with only β,γ-internal alkenes yielding products.

As previously mentioned, Jin, Hu, and coworkers developed a reductive Heck reaction of aryl bromides with styrenes and unactivated alkenes. The reaction requires a preformed palladium catalyst consisting of a specialized constrained bidentate iminopyridyl (CImPy) ligand, which is believed to be vital for stabilizing the palladium center. The authors found that several simple α-olefins were suitable substrates for the reaction, providing reasonable yields with moderate regioselectivities. Both symmetric linear and cyclic alkenes were compatible substrates, although increasing the ring size of the cycloalkene resulted in diminished yields (55 vs. 56). In addition, using 2,3-dihydrofuran as a substrate afforded the 2-substituted tetrahydrofuran product (52) in good yield and high regioselectivity.

Prospects for Applications in the Pharmaceutical Industry 
As is evident from the examples above, reductive Heck hydroarylation can be an enabling disconnection that affords structures similar to those derived from other sp2-sp3 cross-coupling reactions, but with the benefit of simplifying the required starting material (in this case an alkene synthon). This synthetic logic holds substantial promise for applications in the pharmaceutical industry, despite its relatively limited application to date. 

New synthetic methodologies are constantly required in the pharmaceutical sector due to the increasing diversity of chemical modalities used to treat human disease. The rate of exploration of new chemical space has significantly increased over the last few decades, which increases the complexity of the chemical structures being pursued. This continuing evolution represents a consistent challenge to pharmaceutical chemists and demands new bond forming processes. The structural complexity of a molecule is often linked to the complexity of its synthesis, features which can be combined and measured by determining the molecule’s current complexity. In this context, developing commercially viable, efficient and sustainable synthetic routes to these compounds requires both innovation in strategy and capability. To address these challenges, chemists in the pharmaceutical sector have applied the concept of disruptive innovation, innovation that delivers a step change in the efficiency of preparing a molecule, in their approach to route development. Thus, the discovery, development, and rapid application of new synthetic methodologies, such as the reductive Heck reaction, can significantly enhance chemists’ capability to prepare novel drug candidates.

As previously mentioned, Larock’s seminal work laid the groundwork for the application of the reductive Heck to rapid generation of heterocycles. In the years following Larock’s report, the asymmetric synthesis of dihydrobenzofurans, indanones, oxindoles, quaternary indolines, and tetrahydropyridines, has been reported. All of these cores have been important substructures in the development of new drug candidates. 3-Arylindanones were reported to have anticancer activity, and as of 2017, six different oxindole core structures were in clinical trials for over fifteen different indications. Hence, the development of new methods for applying reductive-Heck-like processes to these heterocyclic systems could have a significant impact on the development of commercially viable routes to many different clinical candidates.

While the intermolecular reductive Heck reaction has seen some limited usage in the pharmaceutical industry (synthesis of NK-1 receptor antagonist precursors) and drug discovery, the continued development of reductive Heck reactions on terminal and unactivated alkenes represents a valuable new disconnection in medicinal chemistry. The formation of an C(sp2)–C(sp3) bond between simple aromatic halides and terminal alkenes affords functionalized intermediates from simple, commercially available, inexpensive reagents, and has the potential to replace Negishi and Suzuki couplings as the preferred disconnection for these advanced intermediates. Further, the reductive Heck reaction of unactivated alkenes with aryl bromides has been reported in good yield and moderate to good selectivity, suggesting that the vast array of aryl bromides will soon be suitable partners in a reductive Heck transformation.

References
   

Carbon-carbon bond forming reactions